Jon Farhat is a motion picture visual effects supervisor and second unit director who was nominated at the 67th Academy Awards for the film The Mask, in the category of Best Visual Effects. His nomination was shared with Tom Bertino, Scott Squires and Steve 'Spaz' Williams.  He was nominated for two BAFTA awards for Visual Effects for The Mask and The Nutty Professor Prior production roles included art director, matte painting, conceptual illustrator and storyboard artist dating back to 1992.  Between 2012-2014, he served briefly as executive vice president of Red Digital Cinema Camera Company.   A commercial helicopter pilot, Farhat pioneered research and developed systems and flight planning interfaces for Unmanned Aerial Vehicles, specializing in fully autonomous flight systems.

Selected filmography as Visual Effects Supervisor
Coming 2 America (2021)
Hansel and Gretel: Witch Hunters (2013)
The Book of Eli (2010)
Wanted (2008)
The Interpreter (2005)
Doom (2005)
Blue Crush (2002)
Nutty Professor II: The Klumps (2000)
Doctor Dolittle (1998)
The Nutty Professor (1996)
Dead Man (1995)
The Mask (1994)

References

External links

Living people
Special effects people
Year of birth missing (living people)